Vank or Vangli is a village de facto in the Martakert Province of the breakaway Republic of Artsakh, de jure in the Kalbajar District of Azerbaijan, in the disputed region of Nagorno-Karabakh. The village has an ethnic Armenian-majority population, and also had an Armenian majority in 1989. The 13th-century Gandzasar Monastery, and the 9th-century Khokhanaberd fortress are located near Vank.

History 

The village of Vank (meaning monastery in Armenian) was founded in the 9th century, and was named as such for its proximity to Gandzasar Monastery. Although the current structure of Gandzasar was built in the 13th century, a church or monastery existed at the site several centuries before then. The village was previously also known by the name Vankashen.

The village is surrounded by several historical monuments dating to the Middle Ages. The most prominent among them is the thirteenth-century monastic complex of Gandzasar (built from 1216–38), which overlooks the village and was built by the Armenian ruler of the Principality of Khachen, Prince Hasan-Jalal Dawla. Khokhanaberd, a 9th-century mountaintop fortress is also located near Vank, which served as a castle and residence of rulers of the House of Hasan-Jalalyan.

During the Soviet period, the village was a part of the Mardakert District of the Nagorno-Karabakh Autonomous Oblast.

In the years following the conclusion of the First Nagorno-Karabakh War (1988-1994), the village has seen an increase in investment from the Armenian diaspora. Levon Hairapetyan, a Russian-based Armenian businessman and a native of Vank, has funded the reconstruction of homes, the local school, and sponsored the building of a zoo, and the nearby Hotel Eclectica, which resembles a ship. In October 2008, Vank was also one of several venues in Nagorno-Karabakh for a mass wedding of 560 Armenian couples.

Historical heritage sites 
Historical heritage sites in and around the village include the 12th-century church of Yeghtsun Khut, the 12th/13th-century monastery of Havaptuk, a 12th/13th-century cemetery, Gandzasar monastery (1216-1238), a 13th-century khachkar, a 13th-century village, and the medieval shrine of Yeghegyan Nahatak.

Economy and culture 
The population is mainly engaged in agriculture and animal husbandry. As of 2015, the village has a municipal building, a house of culture, a secondary school, an art school, a kindergarten, 18 shops, two hotels, and a medical centre. The community of Vank includes the village of Nareshtar.

Demographics 
Vank had a population of 1,284 in 2005, and 1,574 inhabitants in 2015.

Gallery

References

External links 

 Musaelian, Lusine. "A Taste of China in Karabakh." IWPR. CRS Issue 408, September 5, 2007.
 Gandzasar.com: Gandzasar Monastery, Nagorno Karabakh Republic
  The Hasan-Jalalyans, Charitable, Cultural Foundation of Country Development.
 

Populated places in Kalbajar District
Populated places in Martakert Province